This is a list of seasons completed by the Iowa Hawkeyes men's basketball program since the team became a varsity sport in 1901. The program began competing in the Big Ten Conference in 1908.

Seasons

  O'Connor coached the last 11 games of the 1950 season, going 6–5 and 5–5 in Big Ten play. Harrison, who started the season, went 9–2 and 1–1 in conference.
  Iowa's original 1995–96 record was 23–9 (11–7 Big Ten), but the NCAA awarded Iowa a win by forfeit for the January 3, 1996 game at Purdue, originally an 85–61 loss, due to NCAA violations by Purdue.

Notes

Iowa
Iowa Hawkeyes men's basketball seasons
Iowa Hawkeyes basketball seasons